The Daily Telegraph, also nicknamed The Tele, is an Australian tabloid newspaper published by Nationwide News Pty Limited, a subsidiary of News Corp Australia, itself a subsidiary of News Corp. It is published Monday through Saturday and is available throughout Sydney, across most of regional and remote New South Wales, the Australian Capital Territory and South East Queensland.

A 2013 poll conducted by Essential Research found that the Telegraph was Australia's least-trusted major newspaper, with 49% of respondents citing "a lot of" or "some" trust in the paper. Amongst those ranked by Nielsen, the Telegraph website is the sixth most popular Australian news website with a unique monthly audience of 2,841,381 readers.

History

The Daily Telegraph was founded in 1879, by John Mooyart Lynch, a former printer, editor and journalist who had once worked on the Melbourne Daily Telegraph. Lynch had failed in an attempt to become a politician and was looking to start his own paper to reflect the opinion of the common working man. Lynch put together a large team of backers, including an old friend Watkin Wynne, who was unusual for being a very wealthy journalist, and Robert Sands who ran the printing company John Sands. The first edition was published on 1 July 1879, costing only one penny. The first page of the first edition outlined Lynch's vision for his paper saying:
"We wish to make this journal a reliable exponent of public opinion, which we think is hardly represented in the existing press.
"Without disparaging existing journals in Sydney, which we fully admit have many excellencies, we believe that they have missed the great objective of journalism to be in sympathy with and to report public opinion."

When sales of the Telegraph began to fall in 1882 the newspaper was taken over by Watkin Wynne. Wynne introduced shorter, punchier, stories and more sensationalism.

The Telegraph reported on various events and movements of the time. The paper was reported as being a strong advocate for Federation. In the first decade of the 20th century the Telegraph had lost its lead in paper sales and was in a fierce circulation war with other Sydney dailies, particularly the Sydney Morning Herald.

Watkin Wynne remained in charge of the paper until his death in 1921. Under his successors the paper underwent some major changes. In 1924 the paper began running news on the front page rather than just advertising. Still a broadsheet (large format paper), in 1927 declining circulation and financial troubles forced a switch to the smaller tabloid format. In 1929, it was taken over by wealthy tobacco manufacturer Sir Hugh Denison, the founder of the Sydney newspaper The Sun. In 1929, Denison formed Associated Newspapers Ltd (ANL) with Samuel Bennett and media owner Robert Packer. Denison later also acquired the Daily Guardian (which had been owned by Smith's Weekly) which he combined with the Telegraph News Pictorial to form the new Daily Telegraph. The paper returned to a broadsheet format in 1931. From 1936 until its sale to Rupert Murdoch's News Limited in 1972, the Telegraph was owned by Sir Frank Packer's Australian Consolidated Press. Packer sold the Daily Telegraph to Rupert Murdoch's company News Limited in 1972 for $15 million. In 1990, the Daily Telegraph merged with its afternoon stablemate The Daily Mirror. The merged entity would resume the name of The Daily Telegraph in January 1996.

Breaches of media ethics in coverage of LGBTI people 

In 2017, a report by LGBTI rights watchdog Rainbow Rights Watch, analysing more than 8 million published words, found that reporting in Australian press publications Daily Telegraph, Herald Sun, and The Australian were calculated to inflame fear, uncertainty, and confusion about transgender people and issues, and that the Australian Press Council was ineffectual at upholding long term balance and good media ethics.

On 9 June 2021, Sydney University researcher Dr Alexandra Garcia published a corpus linguistics analysis of reporting about LGBTI Australians by the Daily Telegraph and affiliated Newscorp mastheads, the Herald Sun and The Australian.  Following an analysis of more than one million published words, Dr Garcia concluded that Daily Telegraph and its associated publications covered transgender people and issues substantially more than any other organization and the coverage was overwhelmingly negative, with more than 90% of articles representing transgender Australians in a strongly negative light.  The research found that the publication of Advisory Guidelines by the Australian Press Council had not improved the standard of reporting, with most reports and columns being characterized by fear-mongering, misrepresentation of medical science, divisive rhetoric, derogatory language, and suppression and under-representation of the voice of transgender people.  One commentator suggested that reporting standards amounted to "outright bombardment of harassment" targeted at transgender Australians, with unethical reports also being exploited by extreme right-wing groups to mobilize hate against minorities.

Reporting on transgender woman accused of violence found to be prejudicial 
On 7 January 2017 Evie Amati, a transgender woman, attacked customers of a 7-Eleven in Enmore, New South Wales, Sydney with an axe. Four days later, an article written by journalist Tim Blair was published on The Daily Telegraph's website. The article was headlined "Allegedly Axie Evie" and referred to Ms Amati as a "tranny" who had been "chopped herself" and as a "previous he [...] who used to be known as Karl.". The article established no relevance or public interest in the sensational and prominent references to the person's transgender status.

In September 2018, the NSW Civil and Administrative Tribunal considered whether the article constituted unlawful vilification through its "gratuitous references to", and "ridicule of" the woman's transgender status. The Tribunal found that the Daily Telegraph published the article with "apparent disregard for the injurious effect it might have on transgender people". The Tribunal also held that "it is evident that [the journalist] was seeking to make fun of Ms Amati and probably transgender people more generally", and that the "attempt at humour was in poor taste and completely devoid of empathy or sensitivity".The Tribunal also held that the article "contributes to the perpetration and perpetuation of demeaning negative stereotypes and a lack of acceptance of transgender people within the community". The Tribunal ultimately concluded that, whilst "close to the line", the article did not reach the threshold for vilification.

Lawyer Michael Bradley wrote an analysis of the case for political news website Crikey, arguing that the publication of such articles should not be unlawful, but instead that the Daily Telegraph should have sufficient social responsibility to cease publishing the author's "recklessly hurtful attempts at wit – because he did, and does, harm".

As of September 2018, the article has been removed from the website of the Daily Telegraph and replaced with a notice stating "This article is no longer available."

On 18 October 2019, after an investigation spanning 1,011 days, the Australian Press Council concluded that the article breached its Statement of General Principles.

Infographic stating youth homosexuality was a sickness found to be prejudicial 
On 12 July 2017, the Daily Telegraph published an article headlined "Fat Chance Of Being Healthy" in print. The article was syndicated online under the headline "Junk food, alcohol and drugs are fuelling health crisis in young adults". The article contained an infographic that canvassed social health concerns, such as alcohol usage, obesity, and drug dependency, for which "Young Aussies have only themselves to blame".  The infographic included "same sex attraction" among the condemnable health problems it canvassed.

A number of LGBTI Australians complained that the article was prejudicial, saying that sexual orientation is neither a choice nor a medical problem, and such coverage contributes to prejudice, shame and suicide risk for young same-sex attracted people. The 'blameworthiness' implicit in the headline was alleged to perpetuate negative stereotypes about gay children. The article drew condemnation from the ABC's Media Watch, Sydney radio station 2 DAY FM, Pedestrian TV, and Junkee.

Chris Dore, the publication's Chief Editor, responded to the criticism from the Daily Telegraph social media accounts, saying the story had been "misinterpreted" and that it "in no way suggests, or intends to suggest, that same-sex relationships are unhealthy. There is no judgement expressed at all in the story other than diet."

The press regulator, the Australian Press Council, was asked to consider whether the article complied with its Statement of General Principles. The Council concluded its investigations five months later. It upheld the complaint, saying "the reference to ill health and blame in the headlines, with the statistic about same-sex attraction displayed among factors such as obesity and drug use, suggested same-sex attraction is unhealthy and blameworthy. As a result, the article caused substantial offence, distress, prejudice and risk to public health and safety, and there was no public interest justifying this."

The Daily Telegraph was further sanctioned by the Australian Press Council for failing to comply with the requirements around publication of adjudication findings. The Press Council required the publisher to republish the print component of the adjudication as it was not fully compliant with its requirements in the first instance. The reprint was published on 24 January 2018. The Daily Telegraph claimed that "nothing sinister had occurred [in the non-compliance]", and blamed the misdemeanour on a production error.

Opinion Column containing pejorative term 'faggot' 
On 2 May 2019, the Daily Telegraph published an article about a US case of a teacher who refused to use the appropriate pronouns for a transgender student. The article prominently incorporated a video with the word 'faggot' appearing twice, once in capitalised letters. The thumbnail for the video also prominently incorporated the word 'faggot'. On 17 September 2019, following an investigation spanning 16 months, the Australian Press Council found in Adjudication #1785 that "the word 'faggot' is most used as a pejorative term to describe gay men". The Council also found that the inclusion of the word could reasonably be read as "demeaning and mocking of gay men ... and others with diverse sexual orientation, gender identity, or sex characteristics".

Reporting about Australian Defence Force LGBTI Inclusion Guide found to be misleading 
The Australian press regulator, the Australian Press Council, concluded on 13 May 2019 that an article published by the Daily Telegraph about an Australian Defence Force "LGBTI Diversity and Inclusion Guide" breached its General Principles because the report was inaccurate and misleading.  The report's headline was found to have misled readers into believing that the Australian Defence Force had banned service members from using the terms "he" and "she" out of concern for the sensitivities of gender diverse service members.

Interview discussing transgender children that was found to be misleading 
On 12 June 2019, the Australian Press Council concluded a 14 month investigation into an article and associated podcast published by the Daily Telegraph about transgender children. It concluded that the article breached its General Principles because factual claims about medical efficacy were likely to be misleading.  The impugned material concerned an interview in April 2018 between columnist Miranda Devine and Ryan T. Anderson of the conservative American think-tank, The Heritage Foundation. The material substantially focused on medical care for transgender children and adolescents, and claimed that there exists "no evidence that these hormones are safe to be used on kids, no evidence of any reduction in self-harm or suicide".

Opinion column on transgender children found to be misleading 
The Australian Press Council sanctioned a further article by columnist Miranda Devine about Australian transgender children, headlined "What madness can justify mutilating our children?" The piece referred to medical procedures for gender transition as "mutilation", "child surgical abuse" and a "monstrous assault on adolescents' developing bodies".

The Australian Press Council concluded in June 2019 that the article breached its Standards of Practice. It held that the claim of "no evidence that changing sex will reduce the incidence of self-harm or suicide or lessen the impact of other associated mental states" was misleading and expressed in such absolute terms as to be inaccurate.

The ABC's Media Watch criticised the publication for "lack of balance" and for putting religious and political motivations ahead of truth, balanced facts and the public interest in evidence-based medical care.

Gratuitous emphasis on LGBTI status 
On 21 October 2020, the Daily Telegraph published a prominent front page article about the parole of a convicted serial killer who had undergone a gender transition whilst in custody.  The article employed the headlines "Killer's Sex Change Farce", "Fiend's Sex Op on You", and "Serial Killer Wants Medicare Gender Change" in the online version.  The article reported the opinion that the provision of medical care to the offender "is disgusting". The offender's gender transition was not a contributing factor to the Court's decision to parole the individual and the article disclosed no public interest the sensational references to the person's personal medical diagnosis and treatment plan.  On 28 July 2021, following a nine month investigation, the Australian Press Council found that the report breached its media ethics standards of practice because "there was no public interest in diminishing the person's request for gender affirming surgery."

On 11 November 2020, the Daily Telegraph published an article about an adult movie performer from an inner Sydney suburb who was the subject of a noise complaint. The article prominently referred to the resident as gay. The article also referred to the suburb where the noise complaint was made as “Sydney’s gay heartland”. The article included a photograph of the LGBTI Pride flag, and a video from the 2020 Sydney Gay and Lesbian Mardi Gras.  There appeared to be no good reason why the publisher singled the individual out for being gay. In November 2021, the Australian Press Council found that the person’s sexuality was not a contributing factor in the noise complaints, and the prominent and gratuitous emphasis on the person’s sexuality was a breach of the APC’s media ethics General Principles.

Balance and Fairness in Reporting 
On 11 July, 2022, the press regulator, the Australian Press Council, found that the Daily Telegraph's coverage of sensitive issues relating to transgender women participating in sport lacked balance and fairness.  The adjudication found that the publication sought and obtained quotes from two individuals critical of allowing transgender women to participate in sport, and the article contained further links to numerous other articles highly critical of transgender women participating in sport on equal terms to other athletes.  The adjudication noted that no publisher did not seek to cover a range of perspectives and omitted balancing information supportive of transgender women being able to play sport.  According, the Australian Press Council found that the Daily Telegraph breached General Principle #3 which requires publishers to provide "balance and fairness" in articles.

Other controversies

'Black Lives Matter' coverage 
On 14 June 2020 the Sunday Telegraph published an opinion column headlined "Where's the Real Justice?" dismissing the Black Lives Matter protests concerning police behaviour and Black deaths in custody.  The article said that "The reality in this country - and the US - is that the greatest danger to aboriginals and negroes - is themselves." Seeming to ignore the disproportionate rates of black incarceration and black deaths in police custody, the article referred to the shooting of a white Australian woman by US police and asked "where were the marches through the streets of Australia after Ms Damond died?". In response to a complaint submitted to the press regulator, the publication claimed that 'the columnist is entitled to express his personal views on issues which are clearly in the public interest.' Concerns were raised that the article was based on unfounded racist generalisations, employed pejorative slurs, and unfairly characterised Black people as the key perpetrators of racial violence. After an investigation spanning 15 months, the Australian Press Council concluded that the article breached its media ethics General Principles because it was (a) based on significantly inaccurate material or omitted key facts, and (b) materially contributed to distress, offence, or prejudice without any public interest justification.

Coverage of climate change 

In October 2013, Professor Wendy Bacon from the Australian Centre for Independent Journalism comprehensively studied coverage of climate change and climate science in the Australian press. A 97% consensus of qualified scientists agree that human-induced anthropological climate change is real. However, the study found that the Daily Telegraph is amongst Australia's 'most skeptical' media outlets about climate change, and also the most biased against carbon policy. The study found that Daily Telegraphs coverage of climate science contained almost zero coverage of peer reviewed science. The study also found that the Daily Telegraph had "very low levels of features about climate change" with coverage of climate change being dominated by opinion writers promoting their own disbelieving attitudes towards climate change. The majority of commentary was written by columnists with no scientific credentials. A broader study of all News Corporation papers found that 45% of all articles "rejected or cast doubt" over climate change, while 65% of commentary "doubted or outright denied" the very existence of climate change.

In 2019, Susan Forde, Journalism Professor at Griffith University in Brisbane, stated that Newscorp publications such as the Daily Telegraph have historically been "very conservative about climate change.  In January 2020, a Finance Manager within the company, Emily Townsend, sent a resignation message to all staff saying "I find it unconscionable to continue working for this company, knowing I am contributing to the spread of climate change denial and lies", describing the reporting in the Daily Telegraph as "irresponsible". Professor Forde added "For any journalist who is early on in their career, they'd have to ask themselves whether they really want to belong to an organisation which is not contributing in a positive fashion to the defining debate of our times.  It will become harder for [the Daily Telegraph] to get good journalists to work for them, and this will change the culture."

Geoffrey Rush defamation 
On 30 November 2017, the Daily Telegraph published a front page article, headlined "King Leer", alleging that actor Geoffrey Rush had acted inappropriately towards an actress. during rehearsals for the Sydney Theatre Company's 2015–2016 production of King Lear. The article featured an image of Rush shirtless and in white makeup.

Rush denied the incidents, and said his career had been "irreparably damaged" by the newspaper's untrue reports. It subsequently came to light that the Daily Telegraph did not interview the female actor concerned and provided only a bare few hours for Rush to respond to the serious allegations.  Rush filed proceedings on 8 December 2017 in the Federal Court of Australia for defamation against the publisher of the Daily Telegraph, saying the publisher "made false, pejorative and demeaning claims, splattering them with unrelenting bombast on its front pages".

The defamation claim was upheld on 11 April, on the grounds that the Telegraph failed to prove the truth of its allegations. Rush was awarded $850,000, with further damages for the actor's economic losses to be determined later. He said that the female actor was needlessly "dragged into the spotlight by the actions" of the Daily Telegraph. Despite the damaging judgement, the Telegraph stood behind the article's journalist, Jonathon Moran.

Failure to verify photograph of deceased man 
On 3 April, 2021, the Daily Telegraph published a prominent photograph of a deceased Australian man whom the publisher alleged had an "obsession" with pornography.  The article also alleged that the man had fraudulently claimed a medical battle with cancer.  The associated print article by journalist Danielle Gusmaroli carried the words "LIAR" and "DISGRACED" in capitalised case.  It subsequently came to light that the paper had not correctly identified the person in the photograph and the facts concerned a different person altogether. The Australian Press Council found on 24 March 2022 that the publication of the article breached its General Principles, saying "...given the seriousness of the reported conduct of the individual named in the article, there was an obligation on the publication to ensure that the photo was in fact that of the person named in the article. Accordingly, the Council considers the publication did not take reasonable steps to verify the photograph, and to ensure that the factual information in the article was accurate. Accordingly, the Council finds that General Principle 1 was breached.  The Council considers that given the seriousness of the mistake it would have been preferable for the publication to publish a prominent correction rather than a clarification... The Council considers that given the prominence of the photo and the seriousness of the reported past conduct of the individual named in the article and the failure to verify the accuracy of the photo, the publication failed to take reasonable steps to avoid substantial distress."

Tony Zoef defamation 
On 22 August 2013, the Daily Telegraph published an article headlined "Tailor's alter ego as a gunrunner".  The article referred to an individual who was known to Sutherland Shire locals as a "friendly tailor who spends his days altering their clothes". The article claimed that the individual was "alleged" by police to be "the mastermind behind a haul of military-grade weapons smuggled into Australia".

The article mistakenly attributed the alleged crimes to the wrong individual, who subsequently filed a complaint of defamation in the New South Wales Discrict Court. In the first instance, the Court found that, despite the serious errors in the article, the publisher's defence based on a prior offer of amends should prevail.

On appeal, the Supreme Court of NSW upheld the complaint of defamation. It held that, "Taking into account the seriousness of the defamatory imputations and the significant hurt they caused the appellant, the damage to his business as a tailor, the unequal prominence the respondent afforded to the proposed correction and apology and their resultant inadequacy, the modest monetary component of the offer, and the likelihood of the proceedings being successful, the offer of amends was not reasonable." The Court awarded a sum of $150,000 to the complainant.

John Brogden allegations 
The Telegraph was widely criticised for its coverage of former New South Wales Liberal leader John Brogden. After Brogden resigned in 2005, the newspaper ran a front-page headline, "Brogden's Sordid Past: Disgraced Liberal leader damned by secret shame file", detailing past allegations of misconduct by Brogden. The following day, Brogden attempted suicide at his electoral office.

Rodney Tiffen, an academic at the University of Sydney, described the newspaper's coverage as an example of "hyena journalism", judging Brogden's personal life to be off limits following his withdrawal from public life.

Editor David Penberthy claimed that his source was from inside the Liberal Party and that none of the events would have happened if no one leaked from inside the party.

Mount Druitt High School 
On 8 January 1997, the Telegraph published the headline "The class we failed" concerning the Year 12 class at Mount Druitt High School in outer Western Sydney in which no student scored a Tertiary Entrance Rank (TER) above 50 (the maximum possible rank is 99.95). Although the article made clear that the newspaper believed that the state had failed the students, many accused the Telegraph of branding the students themselves as failures and showing a full year photo identifying students.

The story led to a renewed focus on the quality of public schools in Western Sydney and precipitated several reviews of schooling in the area. But for many, the headline highlighted problems with interpreting Higher School Certificate results and the accompanying TER.

The students successfully sued the newspaper in the Supreme Court for defamation. The Telegraph subsequently apologised and settled for damages out of court. The published apology stated:

Later, criticising defamation laws, News Limited CEO John Hartigan said:

Call centres in India 
In October 2006, The Telegraph claimed in a front-page article that Australia and New Zealand Banking Group were using call centres in Bangalore, India. The paper even sent a journalist to Bangalore, Luke McIlveen, and a photographer to verify this claim. ANZ denied the claim, stating that they do not employ overseas call centre staff in India. Subsequently, ANZ pulled all of its advertising from News Limited, including Foxtel and News website, which amounted to $4–5 million, about 10% of ANZ's advertising budget.

In assuming blame, David Penberthy, editor-in-chief of News Limited, defended McIlveen.

Allegations of plagiarism
In 2002, former Telegraph journalist, Matt Sun, was accused of plagiarism by the TV program Media Watch. Editor at the time, Campbell Reid, responded by accusing Media Watch host of having a conflict of interest that "destroyed the credibility of any judgement he could pass on the ethics and standards of others in the media".

Press Council complaint regarding Greens article
In May 2011, The Telegraph published an article making an assertion about the Australian Greens which subsequently prompted a complaint to the Australian Press Council. The article asserted that the Greens had managed to "force" the Government to divert money from flood relief, to fund various Green programs. The Press Council upheld the complaint and stated that the assertion was inaccurate and remained uncorrected.

Press Council complaint regarding series of misleading NBN articles
In June and July 2011, The Telegraph published a series of articles about the National Broadband Network. These articles triggered a complaint to the Australian Press Council, alleging that they were factually incorrect, unbalanced and misleading. In December 2011, the Press Council upheld the complaints on all three articles, forcing the Telegraph to publish the adjudication. The Council also published the following statement in regards to the issue:

Press Council complaint regarding Mark Latham article (Sunday Telegraph)
In December 2011, The Sunday Telegraph published two articles about former Labor leader Mark Latham and an alleged argument he had with his child's swimming teacher. Mr Latham complained to the Australian Press Council that there was a conflict of interest which should have been disclosed as the reporter was the daughter of one of the swim teachers at the school. Mr Latham also complained that the articles breached the privacy of his family, especially his young children, and were not in the public interest. The Press Council upheld the complaint and published the following statement (extract only):

The Council also found that there had been an "unreasonable intrusion on the children's privacy" and upheld that aspect of the complaint.

Press Council complaint regarding asylum seeker article
In November 2011, The Telegraph published an article about asylum seekers with the front-page heading "OPEN THE FLOODGATES – Exclusive: Thousands of boat people to invade NSW". Another headline stated "Detainee Deluge for Sydney". This prompted a complaint to the Australian Press Council, which was upheld. The Press Council published the following statement (extract only):

Press Council complaint regarding series of Clover Moore articles
Throughout 2011, The Telegraph published 17 articles about Sydney Lord Mayor and MP Clover Moore. The articles prompted a complaint to the Australian Press Council. The complainant argued that the articles provided unbalanced coverage and that many of the headlines and phrases were opinion rather than fact. The Press Council upheld the complaint in part and published the following statement (extract only):

This adjudication marked the fourth complaint to have been upheld against The Daily Telegraph under the editorship of Paul Whittaker, since commencing the role in April 2011.

Photoshopping of Mike Carlton onto Boston bombing victim
Following the resignation of Fairfax commentator Mike Carlton, The Daily Telegraph published a 2-page spread attacking Carlton and competing newspaper the Sydney Morning Herald. The spread included a composited image of Boston Marathon bombing victim James Costello, with Mr Carlton's face and wearing an Arab headdress. The photoshopped image portrayed Carlton "escaping Gaza". The image manipulation drew widespread criticism on social media, and forced the editor to apologise, saying he was unaware of the origin of the image.

Counterparts
On Sundays, its counterpart is The Sunday Telegraph.

Its Melbourne counterparts are the Herald Sun and Sunday Herald Sun. In Brisbane, it is linked with The Courier-Mail and The Sunday Mail, in Adelaide, The Advertiser and Sunday Mail, in Hobart, The Mercury and The Sunday Tasmanian, in Darwin, The Northern Territory News and Sunday Territorian.

Political stance 
The Daily Telegraph has traditionally been opposed to the Australian Labor Party, and is often a supporter of the Liberal Party of Australia. A 2013 front-page headline said of the second Rudd Government "Finally, you now have the chance to kick this mob out" and "Australia Needs Tony". The paper's high-profile columnists are predominantly conservative.

A Roy Morgan media credibility survey found that 40% of journalists viewed News Limited newspapers as Australia's most partisan media outlet, ahead of the Australian Broadcasting Corporation on 25%. The survey found that readers took a generally dim view of journalists. In response to the question "Which newspapers do you believe do not accurately and fairly report the news?", the Daily Telegraph came third (9%) behind the Herald Sun (11%) and "All of them" (16%).

At the 2007 Australian federal election The Daily Telegraph for only the second time endorsed the Australian Labor Party. At the 2010 Australian federal election the newspaper endorsed the Coalition and Tony Abbott. In the 2013 election, the Daily Telegraph ran 177 stories that were pro-Coalition and 11 stories that leaned the other way. During both the 2016 and 2019 Australian federal elections, the Daily Telegraph strongly endorsed prime ministers Malcolm Turnbull and Scott Morrison respectively, both of the Liberal Party, while attacking then-opposition leader Bill Shorten of the Australian Labor Party. The Labor party lost both elections. Continued praise of the Coalition provided consistently high approval ratings for prime minister Scott Morrison, when compared to federal opposition leader Anthony Albanese.

Staff

Editors
The Telegraph is edited by Ben English. The previous editor was Christopher Dore. Dore's predecessors are Paul Whittaker, Gary Linnell, David Penberthy, Campbell Reid, David Banks, and Col Allan, who served as editor-in-chief at the Murdoch-owned New York Post from 2001 to 2016.

Circulation and readership
Readership data from Enhanced Media Metrics Australia October 2018 report shows that the Daily Telegraph has total monthly readership of 4,500,000 people via print and digital, compared to 7,429,000 people for its primary competitor, the Sydney Morning Herald.

The Daily Telegraph weekday print newspaper circulation fell from 310,724 in June 2013 to 221,641 in June 2017. Saturday newspaper circulation fell to 221,996 over the same period.

As of February 2019, third-party web analytics provider Alexa ranked The Daily Telegraph website as the 343rd most visited website in Australia (down from 90th in July 2015).

See also 
List of newspapers in New South Wales

References

External links

News Corp Australia
Newspapers published in Sydney
1879 establishments in Australia
Publications established in 1879
Daily newspapers published in Australia
Newspapers on Trove
Conservative media in Australia